Clear Creek Lake is a reservoir located in Stephens County, Oklahoma, approximately  northeast of Duncan, Oklahoma. It was built in 1948 with an earthen dam. It is one of four lakes  that are collectively known as the "Duncan Area Lakes."

Physical description

Notes
 comanche lake isn't part of the 4 lakes. Its Duncan lake, Humphrey,  clear creek and fuqua

References

Reservoirs in Oklahoma
Dams completed in 1948
Buildings and structures in Stephens County, Oklahoma
Geography of Stephens County, Oklahoma